Dysgonia expediens is a moth of the family Noctuidae first described by Francis Walker in 1858. It is found in South America, including Brazil.

References

Dysgonia